Tewaukon National Wildlife Refuge is located in southeastern North Dakota along the western edge of the northern tallgrass prairie, about  south of Cayuga, in Sargent County. The Wild Rice River flows through the Refuge and then into Lake Tewaukon. Established in 1945, the  Refuge is located in the Prairie Pothole Region, one of the most biologically productive areas on earth. It lies within the Tewaukon Wetland Management District.

References
a. Tewaukon NWR website, https://www.fws.gov/refuge/tewaukon
b. Tewaukon Wetlands Management District website, https://www.fws.gov/refuge/tewaukon-wetland-management-district/visit-us

National Wildlife Refuges in North Dakota
Protected areas established in 1945
Protected areas of Sargent County, North Dakota